Awwwards (Awwwards Online SL) is a professional web design and development competition body. It aims to recognize and promote the best of innovative web design. It is a website competition that developers can submit to. The best year-round submissions are awarded at the Awwwards conference and prize-giving ceremony, which take place in various cities across the United States and Europe.

Nomination process 

In the first phase of the nomination process, web designers submit their work through Awwwards' website for consideration for Site of the Day. The work is then judged by the Awwwards community and an international jury panel composed of designers, developers, and agencies. The best daily sites are also published in Awwward's year-end "The 365 Best Websites Around the World" book.

In the second voting phase, the Site of the Month is chosen. Site of the Month winners proceed to the final judging phase of the competition: Site of the Year. This award is given out at the Awwwards conference and prize-giving ceremony.

Jury 

The jury consists of multidisciplinary designers, developers, journalists, and agencies from across the globe. The panel assesses the talent, effort, technicality, and insight that goes into the web projects submitted for consideration.

Awards granted 

Members of the Awwwards Jury score nominees on four separate criteria: design, creativity, usability and content. High scoring sites can win several different types of awards.

Daily

Honorable Mention 
All websites awarded 6.5 or above receive an Honorable Mention.

Site of the Day 
Site of the Day recognizes aesthetic, usability, and technical achievements in web design innovation. Sites remain in competition for Site of the Day for three months from the submission date. Only the highest scoring sites are awarded Site of the Day.

Developer Award 
The developer's award was created in partnership with Microsoft, and it awards developers who have achieved significant web development programming mastery. "Well-developed" websites are those that are interoperable across all major browsers and operating systems, are accessible across a variety of computing devices, and employ HTML5, JavaScript, and CSS coding best-practices. Developer Award winners are invited to be profiled on Internet Explorer’s Showcase, a behind-the-scenes look at what inspired the site and how it was developed.

Monthly

Site of the Month

Yearly

Site of the Year 
Site of the Year is selected by the Awwwwards jury from the twelve Sites of the Month plus additional three nominees from the Site of the Day winners as chosen by the Awwwards team.

Developer’s Site of the Year 
Selected by the Developer jury from the winners of the Developer Award.

Site of the Year (Users’ Choice) 
Selected by all Awwwards users who vote for their favorite site that year.

Designer/Agency of the Year

Annual Winners

Notable winners 
Notable Site of the Year winners include Mercedes-Benz, Bloomberg L.P., Bose Corporation, Warner Brothers, Volkswagen, Uber, and Google.

Editions

Ceremonies

Awwwards prize-giving 
The prize-giving ceremony is held at the first Awwwards conference of each year. Awards given include Site of the Year, Developer of the Year, Agency of the Year, Independent designer of the Year, and Independent Creative Developer of the Year.

Awwwards conference 
These events consist of two-day conferences featuring influential speakers from the web design industry. They bring together designers, developers, and agency representatives from over 40 different countries. Conference speakers include executives and staff from Microsoft, Google, Spotify, Adobe, Opera, Smashing Magazine, and other companies in the tech industry.

See also 

 Favourite Web Awards
 Webby Awards

References

External links
Official Site

Web awards
Web development
Awards established in 2009